Izaya may refer to:

Izaya, also known as Infinity-Man, a character in DC Comics
Izaya the Inheritor, also known as Highfather, a character in DC Comics
Izaya Orihara, a character in the light novel series Durarara!!